Eva Fontaine (born 1974) is an English actress, known for her role as Faith Walker in the BBC soap opera Doctors between 2001 and 2006. The role gave her nominations in 2004 and 2006 for the British Soap Award for Best Actress.

Life and career
Fontaine received her training as an actress at the Anna Scher Theatre School. Fontaine was also a member of the British Shakespeare Company, playing Juliet in their touring production of Romeo and Juliet, and she later played the leading character of Fran in the 2001 British horror film Dead Creatures. From 2001 to 2006, Fontaine portrayed the role of Faith Walker in the BBC soap opera Doctors. Her portrayal of the role resulted in two nominations for the British Soap Award for Best Actress.

From 2018 to 2019, Fontaine appeared in the ITV soap opera Emmerdale, as Dr Hamley. Later in 2019, she appeared in the BBC soap opera EastEnders as Claire Amartey, a case worker for Ruby Allen. She appeared in five episodes. In 2021, she portrayed the role of Esme in the ITV soap opera Emmerdale.

References

External links
 

British soap opera actresses
Living people
1974 births
Alumni of the Anna Scher Theatre School